The Basque Government is the governing body of the Basque Autonomous Community of Spain. The head of the Basque government is known as the Lehendakari. The Lehendakari is appointed by the Basque Parliament every four years, after a regional election. Its headquarters are located in the Lakua district of Vitoria-Gasteiz in Álava.

The first Basque Government was created after the approval of the first Basque Statute of Autonomy on 1 October 1936, in the midst of the Spanish Civil War. It was headed by José Antonio Aguirre (EAJ-PNV) and was supported by a coalition of all the parties that fought the Nationalist forces in the Civil War: those comprising the Popular Front (PSOE, PCE, EAE-ANV and other parties that sided with the Second Spanish Republic). After the defeat of the Republic, the Basque Government survived in exile, chaired by Jesús María Leizaola after the death of Aguirre in 1960. This first Basque Government was formally disbanded after the approval of the current Statute of Autonomy in 1979, after the death of caudillo Francisco Franco.

Upon approval of the new Statute, the new Basque Government was created (1980), superseding the Basque General Council. Carlos Garaikoetxea was the first lehendakari of the new Government.

Current composition 

During the current legislative term, the Basque Government is chaired by Iñigo Urkullu, member of the Basque Nationalist Party, thanks to a government agreement with the Basque Socialist Party-Basque Left Party (PSE-EE). Urkullu got the back up of 41 parliamentarians (30 from the PNV and 11 from the PSE-EE) in his inauguration speech that took place in September 2020.

The composition of the Basque Government is established by the President of the Basque Country, also referred in Euskera as Lehendakari, who selects the counselors that will lead each of the Government departments. During the current legislative term the Government is compounded by eleven departments: Security; Labour and Employment; Public Governance and Self-Government; Economic Development, Sustainability and Environment; Economy and Treasury; Education; Territorial Planning, Housing and Transport; Health; Equality, Justice and Social Policies; Culture and Language Policy; and Tourism, Commerce and Consumption.

Historic administrations 
 Garaikoetxea I (1980-1984)  
 Garaikoetxea II (1984-1985)  
 Ardanza I (1985-1987)  
 Ardanza II (1987-1991)  
 Ardanza III (1991-1995)  
  (1995-1999)  
  (1999-2001)  
  (2001-2005)  
  (2005-2009)  
  (2009-2012)  
 Urkullu I (2012-2016) 
 Urkullu II (2016-2020)

See also 
List of Basque Presidents
Basque Parliament
Basque Republic
Government of Navarre
Communauté d'agglomération du Pays Basque

References

External links 

Official website of the Basque Government